Kalankash (also Romanized as Kalānkash and Kalānkesh; also known as Kalānkish, Kelen-ki, and Kolankesh) is a village in Rudqat Rural District, Sufian District, Shabestar County, East Azerbaijan Province, Iran. At the 2006 census, its population was 871, in 205 families.

References 

Populated places in Shabestar County